The title of Baron Howard was created in the Peerage of England. On 15 October 1470 John Howard was summoned to parliament. In 1483 he was created Duke of Norfolk, and in 1485 he was attainted and his titles were forfeited. It is not clear if the barony of Howard was restored with the dukedom. If so, the barony would have fallen into abeyance in 1777.

Barons Howard (1470)
 John Howard, 1st Baron Howard (1430–1485; forfeit 1485)
 For further barons see Duke of Norfolk and the House of Howard.

See also
 Baron Howard of Castle Rising
 Baron Howard of Charlton
 Baron Howard of Effingham
 Baron Howard of Escrick
 Baron Howard of Glossop
 Baron Howard of Marnhull
 Baron Howard of Penrith
 Baron Howard de Walden
 George Howard, Baron Howard of Henderskelfe
 Greville Howard, Baron Howard of Rising
 Michael Howard, Baron Howard of Lympne

References
 

1470 establishments in England
Baronies in the Peerage of England

Baronies by writ
Noble titles created in 1470